Temple High School may refer to:

 Temple High School (Temple, Texas)
 Temple City High School (Temple City, California)
 Temple High School (Florida)
  Temple High School (Temple, Georgia)